The Longest EP is a compilation album by the American punk rock band NOFX, which was released on August 17, 2010. Despite the title, it is not actually an EP; it is a compilation of songs from 1987 to 2009, plus rarities, out of print material and previously unreleased outtakes. The Longest EP has been referred to as a "sequel" to NOFX's 2002 compilation album 45 or 46 Songs That Weren't Good Enough to Go on Our Other Records. Upon release of The Longest EP, "the other EP's" by NOFX will go out of print.

The artwork and design for the album was done by the "same dude that illustrated the cover of The Longest Line."

Track listing

Personnel
Fat Mike – vocals, bass
Eric Melvin – guitar, vocals
El Hefe – guitar, vocals (tracks 1-24)
Erik Sandin – drums
Dave Casillas - guitar (tracks 25-30)

References

External links

The Longest EP at YouTube (streamed copy where licensed)

NOFX compilation albums
2010 compilation albums
Fat Wreck Chords compilation albums
B-side compilation albums